Alexandru Borza (1887, in Alba Iulia – 3 September 1971, in Cluj) was a Romanian botanist, Greek-Catholic priest and honorary archpriest of Cluj.

As part of a group of professors, physicians, soldiers, and others, he helped bring Scouting to Romania.

In 1923, he founded the Cluj Botanical Garden, which now bears his name. The Retezat National Park, the first nature park of Romania, was founded in 1935 at his initiative.

Before World War II, he was the president of the General Association of the Uniate Romanians (AGRU), a Greek-Catholic association. For this role, he was briefly arrested in 1948, after the Communists came to power in Romania. He was elected a post-mortem member of the Romanian Academy in 1990.

He is credited with first advocating for the legal protection of  Nymphaea lotus f. thermalis while he was the government minister in charge of education.

Works 
Flora și vegetația Văii Sebeșului, Editura Academiei, Bucharest 1959
Nicolae Boscaiu: Introducere în studiul covorului vegetal, Editura Academiei, Bucharest 1965
Dicționar etnobotanic, Editura Academiei, Bucharest 1968
Amintirile turistice ale unui naturalist călător pe trei continente, Editura Sport-Turism, Bucharest 1987

See also

References

External links 

I. Resmeriță: "Alexandru Borza: biolog român, ctitor al Grădinii Botanice din Cluj", Ed. Litera, Bucharest 1976.

1887 births
1971 deaths
People from Alba Iulia
Romanian Austro-Hungarians
Romanian Greek-Catholic priests
Romanian botanists
Botanists active in Europe
Rectors of Babeș-Bolyai University
Scouting pioneers
Scouting and Guiding in Romania
Members of the Romanian Academy elected posthumously
Members of the Romanian Academy of Sciences
Prisoners and detainees of Romania
Delegates of the Great National Assembly of Alba Iulia